Garden Island State Recreation Area is a  unit of the Minnesota state park system in the Lake of the Woods, 19 nautical miles (35 km) from Zippel Bay State Park, near the northernmost part of Minnesota, the Northwest Angle.

Wildlife
Pelicans, cormorants, and gulls fly around the island's eastern edge. Mammalian species of deer, mink, beaver, river otter, fox, black bear, timber wolf, and snowshoe hare are commonly seen by visitors on this island. Bald eagles nest in the trees every year.

References

External links
Garden Island State Recreation Area

1998 establishments in Minnesota
Protected areas established in 1998
Protected areas of Lake of the Woods County, Minnesota
State parks of Minnesota
Lake of the Woods
Lake islands of Minnesota